Sollaug Sárgon (born 20 October 1965) is a Norwegian Sami poet.

Sárgon was born in Guovdageaidnu and is educated as child protective pedagogue. She writes in Northern Sami, and made her literary debut in 2010 with the poetry collection Savvon bálgáid luottastit, which eventually was nominated for the Nordic Council's Literature Prize for the Sámi languages in 2013. In 2017 she published her second poetry collection, ii čága čihkosii.

References

1965 births
Living people
People from Kautokeino
Norwegian poets
Norwegian Sámi people
Sámi-language poets